Title 30 of the United States Code outlines the role of mineral lands and mining in the United States Code.

 —United States Bureau of Mines
 —Mineral Lands and Regulations in General
 —Lands Containing Coal, Oil, Gas, Salts, Asphaltic Materials, Sodium, Sulphur, and Building Stone
 —Leases and Prospecting Permits
 —Lease of Gold, Silver, or Quicksilver Deposits When Title Confirmed by Court of Private Land Claims
 —Lease of Oil and Gas Deposits in or under Railroads and Other Rights-of-Way
 —Synthetic Liquid Fuel Demonstration Plants
 —Lease Of Mineral Deposits Within Acquired Lands
 —Development of Lignite Coal Resources
 —Rare And Precious Metals Experiment Station
 —Coal Mine Safety
 —Mining Claims on Lands Subject To Mineral Leasing Laws
 —Multiple Mineral Development of the Same Tracts
 —Entry and Location on Coal Lands on Discovery of Source Material
 —Control of Coal-Mine Fires
 —Anthracite Mine Drainage and Flood Control
 —Surface Resources
 —Mineral Development of Lands Withdrawn for Power Development
 —Exploration Program for Discovery of Minerals
 —Coal Research and Development
 —Lead and Zinc Stabilization Program
 —Conveyances to Occupants of Unpatented Mining Claims
 —Metal and Nonmetallic Mine Safety
 —Mine Safety and Health
 —Geothermal Steam and Associated Geothermal Resources
 —Geothermal Energy Research, Development, and Demonstration
 —Surface Mining Control and Reclamation
 —Deep Seabed Hard Mineral Resources
 —Geothermal Energy
 —Materials and Minerals Policy, Research, and Development
 —Oil and Gas Royalty Management
 —National Critical Materials Council
 —Marine Mineral Resources Research
 —Methane Hydrate Research and Development

External links
U.S. Code Title 30, via United States Government Publishing Office
U.S. Code Title 30, via Cornell University

30
Mining law and governance